Vyacheslav "Crushin Russian" Vasilevsky is a Russian mixed martial artist currently competing in the Middleweight division. A professional MMA competitor since 2008, Vasilevsky has fought for Bellator MMA, M-1 Global, and Absolute Championship Akhmat. He was the inaugural M-1 Global Light Heavyweight World Champion, and also holds a highly-decorated background in judo and Combat Sambo. He is a 6 time World Combat Sambo Champion.

Biography and career
Vasilevsky was born and raised in the Siberian closed town of Zelenogorsk, Krasnoyarsk Krai. He began training in judo at age nine, ultimately becoming the junior judo champion of Krasnoyarsk Krai, earned national youth judo championship medals, and becoming the judo champion of Siberia as an adult.  By age 19, he was training in boxing and combat sambo, and his success in combat sambo led to invitations to compete in MMA.  With just 10 days of preparation, he won a first-round submission victory over Ladislav Zak with a rear naked choke hold.

His next fight was against Spaniard Daniel Tabera which he lost by unanimous decision. Vasilevsky has only lost on one other occasion, losing another unanimous decision to Maiquel Falcão. amassing 15 victories in a row before the loss to Falcao, and since then has gone 2-0 with both wins coming by TKO. Vasilevsky currently holds 7 wins by KO/TKO, 5 by submission, and 6 by Decision.

Due Vyacheslav's extensive ground fighting background in Sambo and Judo, he was awarded a purple belt in Brazilian Jiu-Jitsu only after a few months of training. His BJJ trainer is Cornel Zapadka, a black belt Brazilian Jiu-Jitsu fighter from Poland.

M-1 Global
Vasilevsky's road to the 2010 M-1 Global Light Heavyweight Championship bout was not easy.  It began with a hard fought split decision victory over Sergey Guzev. Two other bouts in the selection – against Xavier "Professor X" Foupa-Pokam and Shamil Tinagadjiev. – went into the third round, though he also achieved a first-round victory over Alihan Magomedov.  By contrast, none of Tomasz Narkun's professional fights have gone beyond the first round.  The difference in experience between Narkun and Vasilevsky has been touted as potentially significant in their title bout on December 10.

Vyacheslav Vasilevsky defeated Tomasz Narkun via second-round TKO at M-1 Challenge XXII to become the inaugural M-1 Global Light Heavyweight Champion.
Declined from a belt at light weight, moved to the middle weight. April 28 in St. Petersburg on the M-1 Challenge XXV: Zavurov vs. Enomoto be deterred by the belt be afraid Viktor Nemkov and Vinny Magalhaes.

Bellator MMA
Vasilevsky joins Bellator after an incredibly successful career in Russia where "Slava" compiled a dominating 15-1 record. Currently riding a 14-fight win streak, the 23-year-old prodigy will be fighting at middleweight in the Bellator cage. The two-time Sambo World Champion has had success at light heavyweight but feels at home at 185 pounds and immediately adds more world-class depth to the Bellator middleweight roster.
While in the U.S., Vyacheslav Vasilevsky trains under Murat Keshtov at K Dojo Warrior Tribe in Fairfield, NJ.

Vyacheslav faced Victor O'Donnell on March 16 at Bellator LXI  He won the fight via unanimous decision (28–29, 28–29, 28–29) to advance to the semifinal round.

In the semifinal round, Vyacheslav faced Maiquel Falcão on April 20 at Bellator LXVI. He lost the fight via unanimous decision (28–29, 28–29, 28–29).

Vasilevsky was expected to face Doug Marshall in the Bellator Season Eight Middleweight tournament before being replaced by Andreas Spang.

Return to M-1 Global
Vasilevsky defeated Charles Andrade on May 23, 2013 at M-1 Challenge 39. He won via unanimous decision (30–27, 30–27, 30–27). Vasilevsky then faced Vitor Nobrega on October 20, 2013 at M-1 Challenge 42. He won via TKO (punches) in the first round.

He then faced Ramazan Emeev for M-1 Challenge Middleweight Championship at M-1 Challenge 51 on September 7, 2014. Vasilevsky won the fight via TKO in the fourth round.

Vasilevsky faced former Bellator MMA Middleweight Champion Alexander Shlemenko on February 19, 2016 at M-1 Challenge 68. He lost this fight via split decision.

Vasilevsky returned to M-1 four months later he replaced the injured Ramazan Emeev and to face Alexander Shlemenko in a rematch on June 16, 2016 at M-1 Challenge 64. Despite being battered by Vasilevsky in the first two rounds, Shlemenko rallied and won the fight via guillotine choke in the third round.

Absolute Championship Berkut
On 16 September 2016 Vasilevsky signed with the ACB.

Vasilevsky was expected to face Albert Duraev on December 18, 2016, at ACB 50 for vacant middleweight title. Vasilevsky however, pulled out of the fight after got injury ear, the bout was cancelled.

Vasilevsky was expected to face Albert Duraev on April 15, 2017 at the ACB 57: Payback for vacant middleweight title. However, Duraev pulled out of the fight on 7 April and was replaced by Ibragim Chuzhigaev.

Vasilevsky faced Will Noland on July 22, 2017 at ACB 65: Silva vs. Agnaev. He won the fight via submission in the first round.

Championships and accomplishments

Mixed martial arts
Bellator Fighting Championships
Bellator Season 6 Middleweight Tournament Semifinalist
M-1 Global
M-1 Challenge Light Heavyweight Championship (One time; first)
M-1 Challenge Middleweight Championship (One time; current)
2010 M-1 Selection Eastern European Light Heavyweight Tournament Winner
Mix Fight Combat
MFC European Middleweight Championship (One time; first)

Sambo
Fédération Internationale Amateur de Sambo
2017 FIAS World Combat Sambo Championships Gold Medalist
2015 FIAS World Combat Sambo Championships Gold Medalist
2013 FIAS World Combat Sambo Championships Gold Medalist
2012 FIAS World Combat Sambo Championships Gold Medalist
2010 FIAS World Combat Sambo Championships Gold Medalist
2009 FIAS World Combat Sambo Championships Gold Medalist
European Sambo Federation
2014 European Combat Sambo Championships Gold Medalist
2008 European Combat Sambo Championships Gold Medalist
All-Russia Sambo Federation
Russian Combat Sambo National Championship (2009, 2010, 2012, 2013, 2015)
Russian Combat Sambo National Championship Runner-up (2008, 2014)
2010 Baltic Cup Combat Sambo Silver Medalist
2009 S.D. Seliverstova Memorial Combat Sambo Gold Medalist
2008 A.A. Kharlampiev Memorial Combat Sambo Gold Medalist

Hand-to-Hand Combat
Russian MVD Hand-to-Hand Champion (2013)

Mixed martial arts record

|-
|Loss
|align=center|35–9
| David Barkhudaryan
|TKO (punches)
|AMC Fight Nights 102
| 
|align=center|1
|align=center|3:05
|Krasnoyarsk, Russia
|
|-
|Win
|align=center|35–8
|Viscardi Andrade
|Decision (unanimous)
|Russian Cagefighting Championship 9
| 
|align=center|3
|align=center|5:00
|Ekaterinburg, Russia
|Return to Middleweight.
|-
|Win
|align=center|34–8
|Bogdan Guskov
|TKO (punches)
|AMC Fight Nights Global: Winter Cup
|
|align=center| 1
|align=center| 3:01
|Moscow, Russia
|
|- 
|Loss
|align=center|33–8
|Murad Abdulaev
|TKO (elbows)
|ACA 99: Bagov vs Khaliev 
|
|align=center|2
|align=center|3:46
|Moscow, Russia
|
|- 
|Loss
|align=center|33–7
|Magomed Ismailov
|TKO (punches)
|ACA 95: Tumenov vs. Abdulaev 
|
|align=center|1
|align=center|2:20
|Moscow, Russia
|
|-
|Win
|align=center|33–6
|Wagner Silva
|TKO (punches)
|Union Of Veterans: Cup Of Friendship 2018
|
|align=center| 1
|align=center| 1:42
|Novosibirsk, Russia
|
|-
|Loss
|align=center|32–6
|Albert Duraev
|TKO (punches)
|ACB 77: Abdulvakhabov vs. Vartanyan 2
|
|align=center| 1
|align=center| 3:47
|Moscow, Russia
|.
|-
| Win
| align=center| 32–5
| Luis Sergio Melo Jr.
| TKO (punches)
| League S-70: Plotforma S-70 2017
| 
| align=center| 2
| align=center| 3:10
| Sochi, Russia
|
|-
| Win
| align=center| 31–5
| Will Noland
| Submission (rear-naked choke)
| |ACB 65: Silva vs. Agnaev
| 
| align=center| 1
| align=center| 4:56
| Sheffield, England
|
|-
| Win
| align=center| 30–5
| Ibragim Chuzhigaev
| Submission (rear-naked choke)
| ACB 57: Payback
| 
| align=center| 2
| align=center| 3:20
| Moscow, Russia
| 
|-
| Win
| align=center| 29–5
| Matt Horwich
| Decision (unanimous)
| Fightspirit Championship 6 
| 
| align=center| 3
| align=center| 5:00
| St. Petersburg, Russia
|
|-
| Loss
| align=center| 28–5
| Alexander Shlemenko
| Submission (guillotine choke)
| M-1 Challenge 68: Shlemenko vs. Vasilevsky 2
| 
| align=center| 3
| align=center| 2:09
| St. Petersburg, Russia
| 
|-
|Win
|align=center|28–4
|Charles Andrade
|Decision (unanimous)
|PRIDE Fighting Show: The Stars of World MMA
|
|align=center| 3
|align=center| 5:00
|Nizhny Novgorod, Russia
|
|-
| Loss
| align=center| 27–4
| Alexander Shlemenko
| Decision (split)
| M-1 Challenge 64:  Shlemenko vs. Vasilevsky
| 
| align=center| 3
| align=center| 5:00
| Moscow, Russia
| 
|-
| Win
| align=center| 27–3
| Kristijan Perak
| Submission (rear-naked choke)
| M-1 Challenge 62
| 
| align=center| 2
| align=center| 1:02
| Sochi, Russia
| 
|-
| Loss
| align=center| 26–3
| Ramazan Emeev
| Submission (rear-naked choke)
| M-1 Challenge 56
| 
| align=center| 1
| align=center| 1:48
| Moscow, Russia
| 
|-
| Win
| align=center| 26–2
| German Yakubov
| Decision (unanimous)
| Battle Of Champions 7
| 
| align=center| 3
| align=center| 5:00
| Moscow, Russia
| 
|-
| Win
| align=center| 25–2
| Ramazan Emeev
| TKO (punches)
| M-1 Challenge 51
| 
| align=center| 4
| align=center| 4:41
| St. Petersburg, Russia
| 
|-
| Win
| align=center| 24–2
| Maiquel Falcão
| TKO (punches)
| Plotforma S-70: 5 
| 
| align=center| 1
| align=center| 0:37
| Sochi, Russia
| 
|-
| Win
| align=center| 23–2
| Vitor Nobrega
| TKO (punches) 
| M-1 Challenge 42
| 
| align=center| 1
| align=center| 2:45
| St. Petersburg, Russia
| 
|-
| Win
| align=center| 22–2
| Trevor Prangley
| TKO (punches) 
| Platform S -70
| 
| align=center| 3
| align=center| 2:32
| Sochi, Russia
| 
|-
| Win
| align=center| 21–2
| Charles Andrade
| Decision (unanimous)
| M-1 Challenge 39
| 
| align=center| 3
| align=center| 5:00
| Moscow, Russia
| 
|-
| Win
| align=center| 20–2
| Yuri Kalminin
| Submission (rear-naked choke)
| Shield & Sword
| 
| align=center| 1
| align=center| 3:00
| Nizhni Novgorod, Russia
| 
|-
| Win
| align=center| 19–2
| Jorge Luis Bezerra
| TKO (punches)
| League S-70: Finals
| 
| align=center| 1
| align=center| 2:46
| Sochi, Russia
| 
|-
| Win
| align=center| 18–2
| Svetoslav Savov
| TKO (punches)
| League S-70: Semifinals
| 
| align=center| 2
| align=center| 1:38
| Moscow, Russia
| 
|-
| Loss
| align=center| 17–2
| Maiquel Falcão
| Decision (unanimous)
| Bellator 66
| 
| align=center| 3
| align=center| 5:00
| Cleveland, Ohio, United States
| 
|-
| Win
| align=center| 17–1
| Victor O'Donnell
| Decision (unanimous)
| Bellator 61
| 
| align=center| 3
| align=center| 5:00
| Bossier City, Louisiana, United States
| 
|-
| Win
| align=center| 16–1
| Andrey Kalashnikov
| Submission (rear-naked choke)
| CNN - Shield and Sword
| 
| align=center| 1
| align=center| 2:15
| Oblast, Russia
| 
|-
| Win
| align=center| 15–1
| Robert Jocz
| Decision (unanimous)
| PF: Pro Fight 6
| 
| align=center| 3
| align=center| 5:00
| Wloclawek, Poland
| 
|-
| Win
| align=center| 14–1
| Tomas Kuzela
| Submission (rear-naked choke)
| MFT: Fedor Emelianenko Cup
| 
| align=center| 1
| align=center| 4:04
| Nizhny Novgorod, Russia
| 
|-
| Win
| align=center| 13–1
| Enoc Solves Torres
| Decision (unanimous)
| League S-70: Russia vs. Spain
| 
| align=center| 3
| align=center| 5:00
| Moscow, Russia
| 
|-
| Win
| align=center| 12–1
| Andy Sidaminou
| TKO (punches)
| BF: Baltic Challenge
| 
| align=center| 1
| align=center| 3:23
| Kaliningrad, Russia
|Return to Middleweight.
|-
| Win
| align=center| 11–1
| Tomasz Narkun
| TKO (retirement)
| M-1 Challenge 22: Narkun vs. Vasilevsky
| 
| align=center| 2
| align=center| 2:20
| Moscow, Russia
| 
|-
| Win
| align=center| 10–1
| Shamil Tinagadjiev
| Decision (unanimous)
| M-1 Global: Battle on the Neva 4
| 
| align=center| 3
| align=center| 5:00
| St. Petersburg, Russia
| 
|-
| Win
| align=center| 9–1
| Xavier Foupa-Pokam
| Submission (rear-naked choke)
| Sambo-70 / M-1 Global: Sochi Open European Championships
| 
| align=center| 3
| align=center| 1:58
| Sochi, Russia
| 
|-
| Win
| align=center| 8–1
| Alihan Magomedov
| Submission (rear-naked choke)
| M-1 Selection 2010: Eastern Europe Round 3
| 
| align=center| 1
| align=center| 3:21
| Kyiv, Ukraine
| 
|-
| Win
| align=center| 7–1
| Sebastian Libebe
| TKO (punches)
| MFC: Mix Fight Combat
| 
| align=center| 1
| align=center| 3:20
| Kstovo, Russia
| 
|-
| Win
| align=center| 6–1
| Sergey Guzev
| Decision (split)
| M-1 Selection 2010: Eastern Europe Round 2
| 
| align=center| 3
| align=center| 5:00
| Kyiv, Ukraine
| 
|-
| Win
| align=center| 5–1
| Artur Korchemny
| Submission (punches)
| M-1 Challenge 20: 2009 Finals
| 
| align=center| 1
| align=center| 2:20
| St. Petersburg, Russia
| 
|-
| Win
| align=center| 4–1
| Pavel Nohynek
| TKO (punches)
| Gladiator 2009
| 
| align=center| 2
| align=center| 2:02
| Prague, Czech Republic
| 
|-
| Win
| align=center| 3–1
| Abdula Mutalimov
| TKO (punches)
| M-1 Challenge: 2009 Selections 2
| 
| align=center| 1
| align=center| 1:29
| St. Petersburg, Russia
| 
|-
| Win
| align=center| 2–1
| Akhmed Guseinov
| Decision (unanimous)
| KSF: Kstovo Sambo Federation
| 
| align=center| 2
| align=center| 5:00
| Nizhny Novgorod, Russia
| 
|-
| Loss
| align=center| 1–1
| Daniel Tabera
| Decision (unanimous)
| FOL: Team Europe vs. Team Russia
| 
| align=center| 3
| align=center| 5:00
| Perm, Russia
| 
|-
| Win
| align=center| 1–0
| Ladislav Zak
| Submission (rear-naked choke)
| Gladiator: Gladiator of Milovice
| 
| align=center| 1
| align=center| 2:56
| Milovice, Czech Republic
| 

Except where otherwise indicated, details provided in the record box are taken from Sherdog

Combat Sambo record

|-
|align="center" style = "background: #f0f0f0"| Record
| align="center" style="border-style: none none solid solid; background: #f0f0f0"|Result
| align="center" style="border-style: none none solid solid; background: #f0f0f0"|Opponent
| align="center" style="border-style: none none solid solid; background: #f0f0f0"|Method
| align="center" style="border-style: none none solid solid; background: #f0f0f0"|Event
| align="center" style="border-style: none none solid solid; background: #f0f0f0"|Date
| align="center" style="border-style: none none solid solid; background: #f0f0f0"|Round
| align="center" style="border-style: none none solid solid; background: #f0f0f0"|Time
| align="center" style="border-style: none none solid solid; background: #f0f0f0"|Notes
|-
|8–0
|Win||  Umed Khasanbekov|| TKO (punches) ||  World Sambo Championships (Middleweight  division) || 2012|| 1 || 0:48  || National Master of Sports vs. Grand Master Final Match 
|-
|7–0
|Win||  Aleksandr Voronovich|| Technical Decision (8–0) ||  World Sambo Championships (Middleweight  division) || 2012|| 1 || 5:00  || National Master of Sports vs. Grand Master Semi-finals Match 
|-
|6–0
|Win||  Zlobin Maxim|| KO (punch) ||  World Sambo Championships (Middleweight  division) || 2012|| 1 || 1:10  ||International Master of Sports vs. Grand Master Master Quarter-finals Match 
|-
|5–0
|Win||  Fabian Cañulef || KO (punch) ||  World Sambo Championships (Middleweight  division) || 2012|| 1 || 0:12  ||International Master of Sports vs. Grand Master Master 1/8-finals Match
|-
|4–0
|Win||  Magomed Magomedov|| Technical Decision (4–0) ||  2012 Combat Sambo National Championships (Middleweight  division) || 2012|| 1 || 1:23  || National Master of Sports vs. Grand Master Final Match 
|-
|3–0
|Win||  Konstantin Stryabkov|| Technical Decision (4–0) ||  2012 Combat Sambo National Championships (Middleweight  division) || 2012|| 1 || 1:01  || National Master of Sports vs. Grand Master Semi-finals Match 
|-
|2–0
|Win||  Chuldenko Sergey|| Technical Decision (4–0) || 2012 Combat Sambo National Championships (Middleweight  division) || 2012|| 1 || 2:37 || National Master of Sports vs. Grand Master Quarter-finals Match 
|-
|1–0
|Win||   Magomadov Khasmagomad|| Technical Decision (4–0) || 2012 Combat Sambo National Championships (Middleweight  division) || 2012|| 1 || 1:09 || Candidate Master of Sports vs. Grand Master 1/8-finals Match
|-

See also
 List of Bellator MMA alumni
 List of current mixed martial arts champions
 List of male mixed martial artists

References

External links

1988 births
Living people
People from Zelenogorsk, Krasnoyarsk Krai
Russian male mixed martial artists
Light heavyweight mixed martial artists
Russian male judoka
Russian practitioners of Brazilian jiu-jitsu
Russian sambo practitioners
Mixed martial artists utilizing sambo
Mixed martial artists utilizing judo
Mixed martial artists utilizing Brazilian jiu-jitsu
Sportspeople from Krasnoyarsk Krai